

The Besson H-3 was a French civil touring triplane flying boat designed by the Marcel Besson company of Boulogne. One aircraft was built and the type did not enter production.

Design and development
The H-3 was designed as a civil touring flying boat and had single-bay equal-span wings and room for two in a side-by-side configuration cockpit, it was fitted with dual-controls. Initially powered by a  le Rhône 9Z rotary, the H-3 was found to be under-powered and re-engined with a  Clerget 9B rotary, (from Société Clerget-Blin et Cie), driving a tractor propeller.  The aircraft did not enter production and the sole H-3 was re-designated MB-12 in 1922 when it was modified with an enlarged central wing.

Specifications (H-3)

See also

References

Notes

Bibliography

Flying boats
1920s French civil utility aircraft
Triplanes
H-3
Single-engined tractor aircraft
Aircraft first flown in 1920
Rotary-engined aircraft